Boris Grezov or Boris Grezhov (April 4, 1889 – March 3, 1968) was a Bulgarian actor and film director. Grezov was one of the pioneers of early Bulgarian cinema, making important silent films such as Maiden's Rock (1922) and After the Fire Over Russia (1929).

Selected filmography

Director
 Maiden's Rock (1922)
 After the Fire Over Russia (1929)

References

Bibliography 
 Marcel Cornis-Pope & John Neubauer. History of the Literary Cultures of East-Central Europe: Junctures and disjunctures in the 19th and 20th centuries. Volume IV: Types and stereotypes. John Benjamins Publishing, 2010.
 Taylor, Richard. The BFI companion to Eastern European and Russian cinema. British Film Institute, 2000.

External links 
 

1889 births
1968 deaths
Bulgarian film directors
Bulgarian male film actors
Bulgarian screenwriters
Male screenwriters
Actors from Plovdiv
Bulgarian male silent film actors
20th-century Bulgarian male actors
20th-century screenwriters
Film people from Plovdiv